WWFC-LP (99.9 FM) was a radio station licensed to serve Bryant, Alabama. The station was owned by Floral Crest Broadcasting. It aired a Christian radio format. The station derived a portion of its programming as an affiliate of the Three Angels Broadcasting Network.

The station was assigned the WWFC-LP call letters by the Federal Communications Commission on December 20, 2002.

WWFC-LP's license was cancelled by the FCC on April 2, 2020, due to the station failing to file an application for license renewal by April 1.

References

External links
WWFC-LP official website

WWFC-LP service area per the FCC database

WFC-LP
WFC-LP
Radio stations established in 2004
Jackson County, Alabama
Three Angels Broadcasting Network radio stations
2004 establishments in Alabama
Defunct radio stations in the United States
Radio stations disestablished in 2020
2020 disestablishments in Alabama
WFC-LP
Defunct religious radio stations in the United States